Robert Keres (14 August 1907 – 29 October 1946) was an Estonian basketball player. He competed in the 1936 Summer Olympics. He died from wounds he suffered during World War II.

References

1907 births
1946 deaths
People from Antsla Parish
People from the Governorate of Livonia
Estonian men's basketball players
Olympic basketball players of Estonia
Basketball players at the 1936 Summer Olympics